Gualberto Villarroel assumed office as the 39th President of Bolivia on 20 December 1943, and his term was violently cut short by his death on 21 July 1946. A colonel during the Chaco War, Villarroel and the Reason for the Fatherland (RADEPA) military lodge joined the fledgling Revolutionary Nationalist Movement (MNR) to overthrow President Enrique Peñaranda in a coup d'état.

Villarroel formed four cabinets during his 31-month presidency, constituting the 108th to 111th national cabinets of Bolivia. A fifth cabinet was announced on 20 July 1946 but the events of 21 July which resulted in the deposition of the government halted that cabinet from entering office.

Cabinet Ministers 
{| class="wikitable" style="text-align:center;"
! colspan="10" style="background-color:#92B558;" |Cabinet of BoliviaPresidency of Gualberto Villarroel, 1943–1946
|- style="font-weight:bold;"
! colspan="2"| Office
! Minister
! colspan="2"| Party
! 
! Term
! Days
! N.C
! P.C

|- style="height:3em;"
| colspan="2"| President
| Gualberto Villarroel
| style="background:#92B558;" |
| RADEPA
| Mil.
| 20 December 1943 – 21 July 1946
| 944
| –
| –

|-
| colspan="2" rowspan="2" | Vice President
| colspan="8" bgcolor="ECECEC" 
|- style="height:3em;"
| Julián Montellano
| style="background:;" |
| MNR
| Law.
| 6 November 1945 – 21 July 1946
| 257
| –
| –

|- style="height:3em;"
|  colspan="2" rowspan="3"| Secretary-General of the Junta
| Augusto Céspedes
| style="background:;" |
| MNR
| Jrnl.
| 20 December 1943 – 11 February 1944
| 53
| rowspan="2"| 108
| rowspan="2"| 1
|- style="height:3em;"
| Wálter Guevara
| style="background:;" |
| MNR
| Law.
| 11 February 1944 – 5 April 1944
| 54
|-
| colspan="8" bgcolor="ECECEC" 

|- style="height:3em;"
| colspan="2" rowspan="4"| Minister of Foreign Affairsand Worship(Chancellor)
| José Tamayo Solares
| style="background:;" |
| PSI
| Law.
| 20 December 1943 – 16 March 1944
| 87
| 108
| 1
|- style="height:3em;"
| Enrique Baldivieso
| style="background:;" |
| PSI
| Law.
| 16 March 1944 – 8 August 1944
| 145
| 109
| 2
|- style="height:3em;"
| Víctor Andrade Uzquiano
| style="background:;" |
| Ind.
| Law.
| 8 August 1944 – 31 December 1944
| 145
| 110
| 3
|- style="height:3em;"
| Gustavo Chacón
| style="background:;" |
| Ind.
| Law.
| 31 December 1944 – 21 July 1946
| 567
| 111
| 4

|- style="height:3em;"
| colspan="2" rowspan="5"| Minister of Government, Justice,and Immigration
| Alberto Taborga
| style="background:#92B558;" |
| RADEPA
| Mil.
| 20 December 1943 – 11 February 1944
| 53
| rowspan="2"| 108
| rowspan="2"| 1
|- style="height:2em;"
| rowspan="2"| Alfredo Pacheco
| rowspan="2" style="background:#92B558;" |
| rowspan="2"| RADEPA
| rowspan="2"| Mil.
| rowspan="2"| 11 February 1944 – 8 August 1944
| rowspan="2"| 179
|- style="height:2em;"
| 109
| 2
|- style="height:3em;"
| Alfonso Quinteros
| style="background:#92B558;" |
| RADEPA
| Mil.
| 8 August 1944 – 31 December 1944
| 145
| 110
| 3
|- style="height:3em;"
| Edmundo Nogales Ortiz
| style="background:#92B558;" |
| RADEPA
| Mil.
| 31 December 1944 – 21 July 1946
| 567
| 111
| 4

|- style="height:2em;"
|  colspan="2" rowspan="5"| Minister of National Defense
| rowspan="4"| José Celestino Pinto
| rowspan="4" style="background:#92B558;" |
| rowspan="4"| RADEPA
| rowspan="4"| Mil.
| rowspan="4"| 20 December 1943 – 21 July 1946
| rowspan="4"| 944
| 108
| 1
|- style="height:2em;"
| 109
| 2
|- style="height:2em;"
| 110
| 3
|- style="height:2em;"
| 111
| 4
|- style="height:3em;"
| Ángel Rodríguez
| style="background:#92B558;" |
| RADEPA
| Mil.
| 21 July 1946 – 21 July 1946
| <1
| –
| 5

|- style="height:3em;"
| colspan="2" rowspan="4"| Minister of Finance and Statistics
| Víctor Paz Estenssoro
| style="background:;" |
| MNR
| Law.
| 20 December 1943 – 5 April 1944
| 107
| 108
| 1
|- style="height:2em;"
| rowspan="2"| Jorge Zarco Kramer
| rowspan="2" style="background:;" |
| rowspan="2"| –
| rowspan="2"| Law.
| rowspan="2"| 5 April 1944 – 31 December 1944
| rowspan="2"| 270
| 109
| 2
|- style="height:2em;"
| 110
| 3
|- style="height:3em;"
| Víctor Paz Estenssoro
| style="background:;" |
| MNR
| Law.
| 31 December 1944 – 21 July 1946
| 567
| 111
| 4

|- style="height:2em;"
| colspan="2" rowspan="4"| Minister of Economy
| rowspan="3"| Gustavo Chacón
| rowspan="3" style="background:;" |
| rowspan="3"| Ind.
| rowspan="3"| Law.
| rowspan="3"| 20 December 1943 – 31 December 1944
| rowspan="3"| 377
| 108
| 1
|- style="height:2em;"
| 109
| 2
|- style="height:2em;"
| 110
| 3
|-
| colspan="6" bgcolor="ECECEC" {{CNone|Office vacant 31 December 1944 – 21 July 1946
| 111
| 4

|- style="height:2em;"
| colspan="2" rowspan="4"| Minister of Public Worksand Communications
| rowspan="4"| Antonio Ponce
| rowspan="4" style="background:#92B558;" |
| rowspan="4"| RADEPA
| rowspan="4"| Mil.
| rowspan="4"| 20 December 1943 – 21 July 1946
| rowspan="4"| 944
| 108
| 1
|- style="height:2em;"
| 109
| 2
|- style="height:2em;"
| 110
| 3
|- style="height:2em;"
| 111
| 4

|- style="height:2em;"
| rowspan="4"| Minister of Workand Social Security
| rowspan="2"| Minister ofHygiene
| rowspan="2"| Víctor Andrade Uzquiano
| rowspan="2" style="background:;" |
| rowspan="2"| Ind.
| rowspan="2"| Law.
| rowspan="2"| 20 December 1943 – 8 August 1944
| rowspan="2"| 232
| 108
| 1
|- style="height:2em;"
| 109
| 2
|- style="height:3em;"
| rowspan="2"| Minister ofHealth
| Remberto Capriles
| style="background:;" |
| –
| –
| 8 August 1944 – 31 December 1944
| 145
| 110
| 3
|- style="height:3em;"
| Germán Monroy Block
| style="background:;" |
| MNR
| Law.
| 31 December 1944 – 21 July 1946
| 567
| 111
| 4

|- style="height:2em;"
| colspan="2" rowspan="4"| Minister of Education, Fine Arts,and Indigenous Affairs
| rowspan="4"| Jorge Calero
| rowspan="4" style="background:#92B558;" |
| rowspan="4"| RADEPA
| rowspan="4"| Mil.
| rowspan="4"| 20 December 1943 – 21 July 1946
| rowspan="4"| 944
| 108
| 1
|- style="height:2em;"
| 109
| 2
|- style="height:2em;"
| 110
| 3
|- style="height:2em;"
| 111
| 4

|- style="height:3em;"
| colspan="2" rowspan="5" | Minister of Agriculture, Livestock,and Colonization
| Carlos Montenegro
| style="background:;" |
| MNR
| Law.
| 20 December 1943 – 11 February 1944
| 53
| rowspan="2"| 108
| rowspan="2"| 1
|- style="height:3em;"
| Rafael Otazo
| style="background:;" |
| MNR
| –
| 11 February 1944 – 5 April 1944
| 54
|- style="height:2em;"
| rowspan="2"| Edmundo Nogales Ortiz
| rowspan="2" style="background:#92B558;" |
| rowspan="2"| RADEPA
| rowspan="2"| Mil.
| rowspan="2"| 5 April 1944 – 31 December 1944
| rowspan="2"|270
| 109
| 2
|- style="height:2em;"
| 110
| 3
|- style="height:3em;"
| Julio Zuazo Cuenca
| style="background:;" |
| MNR
| –
| 31 December 1944 – 21 July 1946
| 567
| 111
| 4

|}

 Composition 

 First cabinet 
On 20 December 1943, members of the RADEPA young officers clique, in conjunction with MNR militants, overthrew the conservative government of President Enrique Peñaranda. A military junta was subsequently formed which comprised the first Villarroel ministerial cabinet. The junta was a mixture of military officers led by Colonel Gulaberto Villarroel as de facto'' President of the Republic and MNR politicians led by Minister of Finance Víctor Paz Estenssoro with Augusto Céspedes as secretary-general.

The new government faced opposition and lack of recognition from the United States. The distrust came as a result of U.S. participation in World War II and the erroneous belief (sparked by President Peñaranda in order to persecute political opponents) that the MNR was pro-Nazi and pro-Axis. Attempts to placate the U.S. led to the removal of top MNR ministers Augusto Céspedes and Carlos Montenegro, as well as Alberto Taborga on 11 February 1944 but the U.S. maintained its rigid stance so long as the MNR remained in government. Ultimately, the Villarroel government acquiesced and all remaining MNR ministers, including Paz Estenssoro, were removed on 5 April 1944. The removal of Wálter Guevara, who had succeeded Céspedes as Secretary-General of the Junta, brought an end to the military junta and the first Villarroel cabinet.

Second, third, and fourth cabinets 
The second Villarroel cabinet was subsequently formed with "no MNR official in any position of prominence in Bolivia." This finally resulted in the U.S. recognizing the Villarroel regime in May 1944.
A third ministerial cabinet was formed upon the resignation of three senior ministers on 8 August 1944. On 31 December 1944, with U.S.-Bolivia tensions cooled, the Villarroel administration once again invited the MNR into ministerial positions, with Paz Estenssoro returning to his position as Finance Minister. Thus was formed the fourth Villarroel cabinet. At 567 days, this was the longest lasting cabinet of the Villarroel presidency.

1945 saw the return of the office of the Vice Presidency. The position had been abolished by the government of Carlos Quintanilla on 4 December 1939 but was re-added with the promulgation of the new Political Constitution of 24 November 1945. By that point, Julián Montellano of the MNR had already been proclaimed vice president on 3 November and inaugurated on 6 November. Though the office would be vacant during long periods of time from the 1960s to the 1980s, it would never again be abolished.

Fifth cabinet (never took office) 
By July 1946, Villarroel's government had lost its popularity due to the harsh repressions of the opposition and voices critical of the government. These tensions peaked when a tripartite group of workers, students, and teachers threatened to strike if wages were not raised and the MNR stayed in government. The situation spiralled out of control when the MNR Minister of Agriculture Julio Zuazo Cuenca was among a group of government officials who drunkenly smashed the windows of the Higher University of San Andrés. Attempting to deescalate the situation, President Villarroel demanded the resignation of Zuazo on 19 July. Eventually, a fifth all-military cabinet was announced on 20 July without a single holdover from the previous cabinet which presented its resignation at 7 p.m. General Ángel Rodríguez was named Minister of Defense, announcing a halt on the military's order to fire on protesters. Despite these efforts, the new cabinet would never take office as President Villarroel would be overthrown and lynched the following day, bringing an end to his government.

Analysis 
The administration of Gualberto Villarroel saw the definitive end of Military Socialism leading government. The concept, conceived by President David Toro and continued by President Germán Busch, had been an inspiration for the policies of RADEPA and Villarroel. Villarroel's cabinets would feature several ministers who would go on to become influential political figures in the MNR, not least of which being Finance Minister Víctor Paz Estenssoro who would go on to win the presidency a total of four times in 1951, 1960, 1964, and 1985. His party, the MNR, and its splinter groups would dominate Bolivian democratic politics from the 1952 National Revolution up until its fall from grace in 2003. Other MNR ministers in the Villarroel cabinet included Wálter Guevara, a distinguished statesman and diplomat who would serve as interim president in 1979, and Augusto Céspedes, a notable writer, journalist, and diplomat.

Gallery

See also 

 Government Junta of Bolivia (1943–1944)

Notes

References

Bibliography 
 
 

Cabinets of Bolivia
Cabinets established in 1943
Cabinets disestablished in 1946
1943 establishments in Bolivia